The 2013 FIBA Africa Under-16 Championship for Women was the 3rd FIBA Africa U16 Championship for Women, played under the rules of FIBA, the world governing body for basketball, and the FIBA Africa thereof. The tournament was hosted by Mozambique from October 5 to 12, with the games played at the Pavilhão do Maxaquene in Maputo.

Mali defeated Egypt 62–61 in the final to win their third title in a row. and securing a spot at the 2014 U-17 World Cup.

Squads

Draw

Preliminary round 
Times given below are in UTC+2.

Group A

Group B

Knockout stage 
All matches were played at the: Pavilhão do Maxaquene, Maputo

5th place bracket

Quarter finals

5-8th classification

Semifinals

7th place match

5th place match

Bronze medal match

Final

Final standings

Mali rosterAdama Coulibaly, Aminata Diakite, Assetou Diakite, Djeneba N'Diaye, Djenema Dembele, Kadiatou Samake, Kadidia Maiga, Kani Keita, Mariam Coulibaly, Ramata Gadiaka, Saran Traoré, Coach: Sidiya Oumarou

Awards

All-Tournament Team
  Neidy Ocuane MVP
  Djeneba N'Diaye
  Solange Bognini
  Fatma Aly
  Mariam Coulibaly

Statistical Leaders

Individual Tournament Highs

Points

Rebounds

Assists

Steals

Blocks

Turnovers

Individual Game Highs

Team Tournament Highs

Points

Rebounds

Assists

Steals

Blocks

Fouls

2-point field goal percentage

3-point field goal percentage

Free throw percentage

Team Game highs

See also
 2013 FIBA Africa Championship for Women

External links
Official Website

References

FIBA Africa Under-16 Championship for Women
2013 in African basketball
2013 in women's basketball
2013 in Mozambique
2013 in youth sport
International women's basketball competitions hosted by Mozambique